The 2011 Rally de Portugal was the third round of the 2011 World Rally Championship season. It was the season's first European event held on gravel roads. The rally took place over 24–27 March, beginning with a super special stage in the city of Lisbon. The rally was also the second round of the Production World Rally Championship and the inaugural event of the WRC Academy.

Sébastien Ogier won the event for the second consecutive year, to take his third WRC victory. Ogier had taken the lead midway through the second leg of the rally and held on to his lead to win by 31.8 seconds from teammate Sébastien Loeb, with Ford's Jari-Matti Latvala rounding out the podium in third place. Championship leader Mikko Hirvonen ended the rally in fourth place, which coupled with power stage points for Loeb, created a tie between the two at the head of the drivers' championship.

In the support classes, Hayden Paddon won the PWRC class by a comfortable margin of over seven minutes, while Egon Kaur won the inaugural WRC Academy event by a more marginal sixteen seconds.

Results

Event standings

† – The WRC Academy features only the first two legs of the rally.

Special stages

Power Stage
The "Power stage" was a live, televised  stage at the end of the rally, held near São Marcos da Serra.

References

External links

 Results at eWRC.com

Portugal
Rally de Portugal
Rally de Portugal